Le Nain jaune ("The Yellow Dwarf") was a satirical political journal of liberal tendencies, in opposition to the Imperial policies of Napoleon, that was published in Paris, starting in 1814. The magazine ceased publication in 1815. The title was revived in 1863 as a semi-weekly with the subtitle Journal politique et littéraire (meaning "Political and Literary Journal" in English).

References

External links
 Google Books scans:
 Le Nain jaune Vol. 1 nos. 337 to 356 / nos. 341 to 359 — Vol. 2 nos. 360 to 379
 Le Nain jaune réfugié Vol. 3 — Vol. 4

1814 establishments in France
1815 disestablishments in France
Defunct political magazines published in France
French-language magazines
Satirical magazines published in France
Weekly magazines published in France
Magazines established in 1814
Magazines disestablished in 1815
Magazines published in Paris